

262001–262100 

|-bgcolor=#f2f2f2
| colspan=4 align=center | 
|}

262101–262200 

|-id=106
| 262106 Margaretryan ||  || Margaret Ryan Masiero (born 1956), the mother of the American discoverer Joseph Masiero || 
|}

262201–262300 

|-id=295
| 262295 Jeffrich ||  || Jeffrey Rich Jr (born 1983), an American astronomer || 
|}

262301–262400 

|-bgcolor=#f2f2f2
| colspan=4 align=center | 
|}

262401–262500 

|-id=418
| 262418 Samofalov ||  ||  (born 1963), a composer and a soloist of the Ukrainian National Philharmonic || 
|-id=419
| 262419 Suzaka ||  || Suzaka, a city of about 50 000 inhabitants located in northern Nagano prefecture. || 
|}

262501–262600 

|-id=536
| 262536 Nowikow ||  || Igor Nowikow, a physics teacher at Markham District High School in Markham, Canada || 
|}

262601–262700 

|-bgcolor=#f2f2f2
| colspan=4 align=center | 
|}

262701–262800 

|-id=705
| 262705 Vosne-Romanee ||  || Vosne-Romanée, a Burgundy village situated between Beaune and Dijon, France. The village has six Grand Cru vineyards, the most famous of which is Romanée-Conti. || 
|}

262801–262900 

|-id=876
| 262876 Davidlynch ||  || David Lynch (born 1946), an American director, screenwriter, producer, painter, musician, photographer and occasional actor || 
|}

262901–263000 

|-id=972
| 262972 Petermansfield ||  || Peter Mansfield (1933–2017), an English physicist and Nobel laureate || 
|}

References 

262001-263000